The Lapkalnys-Paliepiai Forest is a forest in Kėdainiai District Municipality and Raseiniai District Municipality, central Lithuania, located  to the north east from Ariogala. It consists of smaller forests: Juodžiai Forest, Lapkalnys Forest, Paliepiai Forest, Pašušvys Forest, Šilainiai Forest. It is on the watershed of the Dubysa (Gynėvė with Lendė and Upytė) and Nevėžis (Pečiupė, Ažytė, Ažynas, Raguva, Skerdūmė) rivers.

As of 2005, 48% of the area was covered by birch, 30% by spruce, 8% by aspen, 5% by ash, 3% by oak, 4% by black alder, 1% by white alder, 1% by pine, 1% by lime tree groups. There is the Zembiškis Forest Botanical Sanctuary in the forest.

There are  Lapkalnys, Skirgailinė, Zembiškis, Paskerdūmiukas, Šulcava, Graužai, Tilindžiai, Paliepiai, Žostautai, Juodžiai, Šliužiai, Daujotėliai, Paliepiukai villages inside the forest or on its edges.

Images

References

Forests of Lithuania
Kėdainiai District Municipality
Raseiniai District Municipality